Alexander Putilov is a Czech businessperson and co-owns Eurasia Drilling Company. Eurasia Drilling Company is a provider of onshore drilling services in Russia and the Czech Republic. As of per the Forbes list of 2011, he is the 1,057th richest person in the world and 84th richest person in Russia. Putilov has a net worth of US$1.1 billion. He is a first-generation entrepreneur and his wealth is self-made.

Education
Putilov has obtained Bachelor of Arts and Bachelor of Science degrees from Tyumen Industrial Institute. He graduated in 1974.

History
Putilov, after graduating from Tyumen Industrial Institute in 1974, started working as a repairman. He then became the deputy head of a plant shop and later moved to chief mechanic.

See also
Forbes list of billionaires (2011)
Business magnate
Entrepreneur
Billionaire
List of countries by the number of billionaires

References

Living people
Czech businesspeople
1952 births
Businesspeople in the oil industry